The New York State Public High School Athletic Association (NYSPHSAA) Boys Basketball Championships are held annually to determine the champions of public high schools outside of New York City, though some catholic and independent schools are members as well. The championship games are held each March. After 36 years in Glens Falls at the Glens Falls Civic Center, the championships are held in Binghamton at Floyd L. Maines Veterans Memorial Arena.

The winners of the Class AA, A and B tournaments then compete for the state title in a tournament, called the Federation Tournament of Champions, against the champions of the Catholic High School Athletic Association (CHSAA), the New York State Association of Independent Schools Athletic Association (NYSAISAA), and the Public Schools Athletic League (PSAL) (public schools in New York City). The Federation Tournament of Champions returned to Glens Falls at the Glens Falls Civic Center beginning in March 2017.

Early history

The earliest high school boys' state championship in New York was held in 1921 as a single-class tournament. The tournament continued as a one-classification competition through 1929, then as a two-classification (A and B) competition from 1930 through 1932. After the 1932 tournament, the NYSPHSAA voted against continuing the competition. According to Alton Doyle, the executive director of the NYSPHSAA from 1975 to 1990, there were many violations of the rules on eligibility, with some schools using overage students, and gambling was widespread. The state tournament was believed to be a cause of such problems, leading to the decision to eliminate the tournament.

Regional tournaments continued over the years without any overall state championship. From 1974 through 1977, various inter-sectional, regional and inter-class post-season tournaments were held. In 1976, the state legislature passed a bill to authorize a state tournament, which began in 1978.

Sections and classifications

Winners of each section compete in the NYSPHSAA tournament, by size classification, for the NYSPHSAA state championship. There are 11 sections, as follows:

Section 1: Dutchess, Putnam, Rockland, Westchester Counties
Section 2: Capital District
Section 3: Central New York
Section 4: Southern Tier
Section 5: Genesee Valley
Section 6: Western New York
Section 7: Champlain Area
Section 8: Nassau County
Section 9: Orange, Sullivan, Ulster Counties
Section 10: St. Lawrence Area
Section 11: Suffolk County

Each section is further divided into classes, by school enrollment size. The classes are, from largest schools to smallest, AA, A, B, C, and D. For 2015, the classification enrollment cutoffs were as follows, counting the number of 9th, 10th and 11th grade students in the previous scholastic year (enrollment is doubled for all-boys schools):

 Class AA: 910 and more
 Class A: 480-909
 Class B: 280-479
 Class C: 170-279
 Class D: 169 and fewer

A school may elect to play in a higher classification, but may not elect to play in a lower classification.

Winners and runners-up

Winners and runners-up of the single-classification tournament from 1921 through 1929 were:

Winners and runners-up of the two-classification tournament from 1930 through 1932 were:

Venues of the current, multi-classification tournament:

Results of the current, multi-classification tournament, through 2019:

Championships by school

Results through 2020:

Championships by section

Results through 2020:

References

High school sports in New York (state)
High school basketball competitions in the United States
Basketball competitions in New York (state)
Sports in Glens Falls, New York
Sports in Binghamton, New York